Thanonchai Thanakorngym (ธนญชัย ธนกรยิมส์) is a retired Thai Muay Thai fighter.

Biography

Thanonchai started training in Muay Thai with his father at 12 years old. He then went to train with the legend Sangtiennoi Sor Rungroj at his gym and fought under the name Thanonchai Tor.Sangtiennoi.

In 2015 Thanonchai changed gym to go train with Samart Payakaroon and fought under the name Thanonchai Thanakorngym.

Thanonchai is a fan favorite of the stadiums because of his aggressive style and relentless pressure which he displayed 9 times against his rival and Muay Thai phenom Sangmanee Sor Tienpo. Some of these fights being particularly brutal and considered the best of their year.

His fights against Saeksan Or. Kwanmuang are also vividly remembered by the fans as highlights of the year in Muay Thai.

As of February 2016 he was ranked #1 in Rajadamnern Stadium at Super Featherweight according to Muaythai2000

In late 2016 Thanonchai underwent knee surgery and spent 8 months in rehabilitation.
He made his comeback on the international scene fighting under kickboxing rules mainly in China.

Thanonchai made his return to Muay thai in March 2019 after signing with a new sponsor, now fighting under the name Thanonchai Somwanggaiyang. In France at the Emperor Chok Dee event he won his fight by decision.

He also became a boxing trainer during his time outside Muay Thai competition in Hong Kong and announced that he would come back to muay thai in Thailand in 2019.

In June 2019 Thanonchai signed a contract with the ONE Championship organization.

Titles and accomplishments

Rajadamnern Stadium
2015 Rajadamnern Stadium Fight of the Year (vs Saeksan Or. Kwanmuang on February 12)
2016 Rajadamnern Stadium Fight of the Year (vs Sangmanee Sor Tienpo)
Awards
 2015 Siam Sport Fighter of the Year

Fight record

|-  style="background:#fbb;"
| 2022-09-17|| Loss ||align=left| Batman Or.Atchariya || Ruamponkon Samui + Kiatpetch Samui Fight, Petchbuncha Stadium || Koh Samui, Thailand ||TKO (Doctor stoppage) ||4 || 
|-  style="background:#cfc;"
| 2022-08-27|| Win||align=left| Darky NokKhao GorMor11  || Ruamponkon Samui + Kiatpetch Samui Fight, Petchbuncha Stadium ||Koh Samui, Thailand || Decision||5  ||3:00

|-  style="background:#cfc;"
| 2022-05-21|| Win||align=left| Albert Xavier  || Fairtex Fight, Lumpinee Stadium ||Bangkok, Thailand || KO||1  || 
|-  style="background:#fbb;"
| 2022-04-17|| Loss ||align=left| Yok Parunchai  || Channel 7 Stadium ||Bangkok, Thailand ||Decision || 5 || 3:00
|-  style="background:#fbb;"
| 2022-03-13|| Loss ||align=left| Rambolek Tor.Yotha  || Channel 7 Stadium ||Bangkok, Thailand ||Decision || 5 || 3:00
|-  style="background:#cfc;"
| 2021-11-26|| Win ||align=left| Saeksan Or. Kwanmuang || Muay Thai Moradok Kon Thai + Rajadamnern Super Fight || Buriram, Thailand || Decision || 5 || 3:00

|-  style="background:#fbb;"
| 2021-09-25|| Loss ||align=left| PhetUtong Or.Kwanmuang || Kiatpetch, Lumpinee GoSport Studio || Bangkok, Thailand || Decision || 5 || 3:00

|-  style="background:#fbb;"
| 2021-03-07|| Loss||align=left| Nuathoranee Samchaivisetsuk || Channel 7 Stadium || Bangkok, Thailand || Decision || 5|| 3:00
|-
! style=background:white colspan=9 |
|-  style="background:#fbb;"
| 2020-12-08|| Loss||align=left| Siwakorn kiatjaroenchai || Lumpinee Birthday Show, Lumpinee Stadium || Bangkok, Thailand || Decision || 5|| 3:00
|-  style="background:#fbb;"
| 2020-11-01 || Loss ||align=left| Thaksinlek Kiatniwat  || Channel 7 Stadium || Bangkok, Thailand || Decision || 5 || 3:00
|-  style="background:#fbb;"
| 2020-07-18|| Loss ||align=left| Saeksan Or. Kwanmuang || Siam Omnoi Stadium || Samut Sakhon, Thailand || Decision || 5 || 3:00
|-
! style=background:white colspan=9 |
|-  style="background:#FBB;"
| 2020-03-05|| Loss||align=left| Saeksan Or. Kwanmuang || Rajadamnern Stadium || Bangkok, Thailand || KO (Right Elbow)|| 3 ||
|-
! style=background:white colspan=9 |
|-  style="background:#fbb;"
| 2020-01-31|| Loss ||align=left| Saeksan Or. Kwanmuang || Phuket Super Fight Real Muay Thai || Mueang Phuket District, Thailand || Decision || 5||3:00
|-  style="background:#cfc;"
| 2020-01-08||Win||align=left| Gingsanglek Tor.Laksong || Rajadamnern Stadium || Bangkok, Thailand ||KO (Left Straight) ||3||
|-  style="background:#cfc;"
| 2019-12-12||Win||align=left| Apiwat Sor.Somnuek || Rajadamnern Stadium || Bangkok, Thailand ||Decision||5||3:00
|-  style="background:#cfc;"
| 2019-10-17 || Win ||align=left| Thaksinlek Kiatniwat  || Rajadamnern Stadium || Bangkok, Thailand || KO (Left Straight) || 4 ||
|- style="background:#cfc;"
| 2019-09-15 || Win ||align=left| Liu Moudon || Muay Thai Super Champ || Bangkok, Thailand || KO (Left Elbow) || 2 ||
|- style="background:#cfc;"
| 2019-07-22 || Win ||align=left| Ly Phea || Muay Thai Super Champ || Bangkok, Thailand || Decision || 3 || 3:00
|- style="background:#cfc;"
| 2019-06-17 || Win ||align=left| Mostafa Tabtaghzade || Muay Thai Super Champ || Bangkok, Thailand || Decision || 3 || 3:00
|- style="background:#cfc;"
| 2019-03-16 || Win ||align=left| Yassine Hamlaoui || Emperor Chok Dee || France || Decision || 5 || 3:00
|-  style="background:#fbb;"
| 2017-09-23 || Loss || align=left| Wei Rui || Glory of Heroes: Luoyang - GOH 63 kg Championship Tournament, Semi-Finals || Luoyang, Henan || Decision (Unanimous) || 3 || 3:00
|- style="background:#cfc;"
| 2017-08-05 || Win ||align=left| Jin Ying || Wu Lin Feng 2017: China VS Thailand || Zhengzhou, China || Decision || 3 || 3:00
|- style="background:#cfc;"
| 2016-11-27 || Win ||align=left| Celestin Mendes || Warriors Night || France || TKO (Left Elbow) || 3 ||
|- style="background:#cfc;"
| 2016-10-01 || Win ||align=left| Kong Long || Glory of Heroes 5 || Zhengzhou, China || Decision || 3 || 3:00
|-  bgcolor="#c5d2ea"
| 2016-09-14 || Draw ||align=left| Sangmanee Sor Tienpo || Rajadamnern Stadium || Bangkok, Thailand || Draw || 5 || 3:00
|-  style="background:#cfc;"
| 2016-07-21 || Win ||align=left| Sangmanee Sor Tienpo   || Rajadamnern Stadium || Bangkok, Thailand || Decision || 5 || 3:00
|-  style="background:#fbb;"
| 2016-03-31 || Loss ||align=left| Sangmanee Sor Tienpo  || Onesongchai Fights, Rajadamnern Stadium || Bangkok, Thailand || Decision || 5 || 3:00
|- style="background:#cfc;"
| 2016-03-05 || Win ||align=left| Shou Rong || Wu Lin Feng : China vs Thailand || China || Decision || 3 || 3:00
|-  style="background:#cfc;"
| 2016-02-24 || Win ||align=left| Sangmanee Sor Tienpo   || Onesongchai Fights, Rajadamnern Stadium || Bangkok, Thailand || Decision || 5 || 3:00
|-  style="background:#cfc;"
| 2016-01-24|| Win ||align=left|  Saeksan Or. Kwanmuang || Samui Festival|| Koh Samui, Thailand || Decision || 5 || 3:00
|-  style="background:#cfc;"
| 2015-12-23|| Win ||align=left| Panpayak Sitjatik ||  Rajadamnern Stadium || Bangkok, Thailand || KO (Straight Left) || 3  ||
|-  style="background:#cfc;"
| 2015-11-19|| Win ||align=left| Phet Utong Or. Kwanmuang  ||  Rajadamnern Stadium || Bangkok, Thailand || KO (Left Cross) || 3  ||
|-  style="background:#fbb;"
| 2015-10-14 || Loss ||align=left| Sangmanee Sor Tienpo  || Onesongchai Anniversary Show, Rajadamnern Stadium || Bangkok, Thailand || Decision || 5 || 3:00
|-  style="background:#cfc;"
| 2015-09-10|| Win ||align=left| Phet Utong Or. Kwanmuang  ||  Rajadamnern Stadium || Bangkok, Thailand || Decision || 5 || 3:00
|-  style="background:#fbb;"
| 2015-07-02|| Loss ||align=left|  Muangthai PKSaenchaimuaythaigym  || Tor.Chaiwat Fight, Rajadamnern Stadium || Bangkok, Thailand || Decision|| 5 || 3:00
|-  style="background:#c5d2ea;"
| 2015-06-04 || Draw ||align=left| Saeksan Or. Kwanmuang || Rajadamnern Stadium || Bangkok, Thailand || Decision || 5 || 3:00
|-  style="background:#cfc;"
| 2015-03-30 || Win ||align=left| Thaksinlek Kiatniwat || Rajadamnern Stadium || Bangkok, Thailand || Decision || 5 || 3:00
|-  style="background:#cfc;"
| 2015-02-12 || Win ||align=left| Saeksan Or. Kwanmuang || Rajadamnern Stadium || Bangkok, Thailand || Decision || 5 || 3:00
|-  style="background:#cfc;"
| 2015-01-08 || Win ||align=left| Thaksinlek Kiatniwat || Rajadamnern Stadium || Bangkok, Thailand || Decision || 5 || 3:00
|-  style="background:#cfc;"
| 2014-12-01 || Win ||align=left| Sangmanee Sor Tienpo   || Rajadamnern Stadium|| Bangkok, Thailand || Decision || 5 || 3:00 
|-
|-  bgcolor="#c5d2ea"
| 2014-11-10 || Draw ||align=left| Sangmanee Sor Tienpo || Rajadamnern Stadium || Bangkok, Thailand || Draw || 5 || 3:00
|-  style="background:#cfc;"
| 2014-10-08 || Win ||align=left| Sangmanee Sor Tienpo   || Rajadamnern Stadium|| Bangkok, Thailand || Decision || 5 || 3:00
|-  style="background:#fbb;"
| 2014-08-14|| Loss ||align=left| Superlek Kiatmuu9  || Rajadamnern Stadium || Bangkok, Thailand || Decision || 5 || 3:00
|-  style="background:#cfc;"
| 2014-06-25 || Win||align=left| Sangmanee Sor Tienpo || Rajadamnern Stadium || Bangkok, Thailand || Decision || 5 || 3:00
|-  style="background:#fbb;"
| 2014-05-07 || Loss ||align=left| Singtongnoi Por.Telakun || Rajadamnern Stadium || Bangkok, Thailand || Decision || 5 || 3:00
|-  style="background:#fbb;"
| 2014-02-28 || Loss ||align=left| Rungphet Kaiyanghadao || Lumpinee Stadium || Bangkok, Thailand || Decision || 5 || 3:00 
|-
! style=background:white colspan=9 |
|-  style="background:#cfc;"
| 2014-01-17 || Win ||align=left| Sirimongkol P.K.Muaythai || Lumpinee Stadium || Bangkok, Thailand || Decision || 5 || 3:00
|-  style="background:#fbb;"
| 2013-12-03|| Loss ||align=left| Superlek Kiatmuu9  ||Lumpinee Stadium || Bangkok, Thailand || Decision || 5 || 3:00
|-
! style=background:white colspan=9 |
|-  style="background:#cfc;"
| 2013-11-06 || Win ||align=left|  Lamnammoon Sakchaichote || Rajadamnern Stadium || Bangkok, Thailand || Decision || 5 || 3:00
|-  style="background:#fbb;"
| 2013-10-08|| Loss ||align=left| Superbank Mor Ratanabandit || Lumpinee Stadium || Bangkok, Thailand || Decision || 5 || 3:00 
|-  bgcolor="#cfc"
! style=background:white colspan=9 |
|-  style="background:#cfc;"
| 2013-09-11|| Win ||align=left| Pettawee Sor Kittichai || Lumpinee Stadium || Bangkok, Thailand || Decision || 5 || 3:00
|-  style="background:#cfc;"
| 2013-08-05 || Win ||align=left| Muangthai PKSaenchaimuaythaigym || Rajadamnern Stadium || Bangkok, Thailand || TKO (Referee Stoppage/Broken Teeth)|| 3 || 0:38
|-  style="background:#cfc;"
| 2013-07-09|| Win ||align=left| Yodtongthai Por Telakun || Lumpinee Stadium || Bangkok, Thailand || Decision || 5 || 3:00
|-  style="background:#c5d2ea;"
| 2013-06-03|| Draw ||align=left| Pettawee Sor Kittichai || Rajadamnern Stadium || Bangkok, Thailand || Decision || 5 || 3:00
|-  style="background:#fbb;"
| 2013-05-07|| Loss ||align=left| Pokaew Fonjangchonburi || Lumpinee Stadium || Bangkok, Thailand || Decision || 5 || 3:00
|-  style="background:#cfc;"
| 2013-04-05|| Win ||align=left| Pettawee Sor Kittichai || Lumpinee Stadium || Bangkok, Thailand || KO (punch) || 3 ||
|-  style="background:#cfc;"
| 2013-02-21|| Win ||align=left| Wisanupon Sujeebameekeow || Rajadamnern Stadium || Bangkok, Thailand || Decision || 5 || 3:00
|-  style="background:#cfc;"
| 2012-12-24|| Win ||align=left| Rungrat Naratrikul || Rajadamnern Stadium || Bangkok, Thailand || Decision || 5 || 3:00
|-  style="background:#cfc;"
| 2012-11-22|| Win ||align=left| Fonluang Sitboonmee || Rajadamnern Stadium || Bangkok, Thailand || Decision || 5 || 3:00
|-  style="background:#cfc;"
| 2012-10-29|| Win ||align=left| Luknimit Singklongsi || Rajadamnern Stadium || Bangkok, Thailand || Decision || 5 || 3:00
|-  style="background:#cfc;"
| 2012-10-08|| Win ||align=left| Sayannoi Tor Laksong || Rajadamnern Stadium || Bangkok, Thailand || KO || 3 ||
|-  style="background:#cfc;"
| 2012-09-03|| Win ||align=left| Lomtalay Sitzoraueng || Sor.Sommai Rajadamnern Stadium|| Bangkok, Thailand || Decision || 5 || 3:00
|-  style="background:#cfc;"
| 2012-08-08|| Win ||align=left| Khunsueklek Or Kwanmuang|| Sor.Sommai Rajadamnern Stadium|| Bangkok, Thailand || Decision || 5 || 3:00
|-  style="background:#cfc;"
| 2012-05-31|| Win ||align=left| Naka Kaewsamrit || Sor.Sommai Rajadamnern Stadium || Bangkok, Thailand || Decision || 5 || 3:00
|-  style="background:#cfc;"
| 2012-05-03|| Win ||align=left| Theeva Tor.Surat || Lumpinee Stadium || Bangkok, Thailand || Decision || 5 || 3:00
|-  style="background:#cfc;"
| 2011-08-08|| Win ||align=left| Yodmongkon Muangsima || Rajadamnern Stadium || Bangkok, Thailand || Decision || 5 || 3:00
|-  style="background:#fbb;"
| 2011-03-15|| Loss ||align=left| Theeva Tor.Surat || Lumpinee Stadium || Bangkok, Thailand || Decision || 5 || 3:00
|-  style="background:#fbb;"
| 2011-02-21|| Loss ||align=left| Singsuriya Alloysrinakorn|| Rajadamnern Stadium || Thailand || Decision || 5 || 3:00
|-  style="background:#fbb;"
| 2011-01-21|| Loss ||align=left| Luknimit Singklongsi || Lumpinee Stadium || Bangkok, Thailand || Decision || 5 || 3:00
|-  style="background:#cfc;"
| 2010-12-16|| Win ||align=left| Yodmongkon Muangsima || Rajadamnern Stadium || Bangkok, Thailand || Decision || 5 || 3:00
|-  style="background:#cfc;"
| 2010-11-11|| Win ||align=left| Theeva Tor.Surat || Rajadamnern Stadium || Bangkok, Thailand || Decision || 5 || 3:00
|-  style="background:#cfc;"
| 2010-09-15|| Win ||align=left| Thaveesak || Rajadamnern Stadium || Bangkok, Thailand || Decision || 5 || 3:00
|-  style="background:#fbb;"
| 2009-07-09 || Loss ||align=left| Anuwatlek Por Telakun || Rajadamnern Stadium || Bangkok, Thailand || Decision || 5 || 3:00
|-  style="background:#fbb;"
| 2009-06-08 || Loss ||align=left| Anuwatlek Por Telakun || Rajadamnern Stadium || Bangkok, Thailand || Decision || 5 || 3:00
|-  style="background:#fbb;"
| 2007|| Loss ||align=left| Yodtongthai Por Telakun || Rajadamnern Stadium || Bangkok, Thailand || Decision || 5 || 3:00 
|-
! style=background:white colspan=9 |
|-
|-
| colspan=9 | Legend:

References

Thanonchai Thanakorngym
1993 births
Living people
Thanonchai Thanakorngym